Abane (Avane), one of several languages called Baniwa, also known as Baniva Yavitero, was an Arawakan language of Venezuela. It is believed to have become extinct by the late 20th century, and is only attested in a short word-list from the late 18th century.

History 
It was primarily spoken in the Amazonas region of Venezuela and along the Colombian border, and had dialects called Quirruba and Baniva-Avani.

The language likely began deteriorating with the arrival of the Jesuits in the late 18th century.

The Avane language included a colloquial name to refer to the neighboring indigenous Maipure people, "Metimetichini", which may be humorously alluding to the polysyllabic nature of many Maipure words and contains two sounds not usually found in Avane. The language also shares some words with others in the same family, including Maipure and Guipunave, but is clearly phonetically distinct.

Phonetics 
Avane is characterized phonetically in comparison to Maipure, showing some large differences. Avane uses the dental stop /[d]/, which is not seen in Maipure but is native to Yavitero and Baniva. It uses the glottal fricative /[h]/ (/[x]/) before /[i]/ and/or /[a]/, where Maipure would use /[t]/, /[k]/, and /[j]/. Also unlike Maipure, the Avane diphthongs /[ai]/ and /[au]/ do not appear to be contracted in stressed syllables. Ethnographer Gilij described the Avane pronunciation as "rude, guttural" compared to the Maipure's "gentle, beautiful" version.

Morphology 
In morphology, Avane is seen as close to Maipure, with both using the "empty morph" suffix "-cà" for certain active and mainly intransitive verbs.

References

Indigenous languages of the South American Northern Foothills
Arawakan languages